American rapper Eminem has released 11 studio albums, two compilation albums, and one extended play. His music has been released on record labels Interscope Records and Aftermath Entertainment, along with subsidiaries Web Entertainment and his own Shady Records. Eminem is the best-selling rapper of all time and the best-selling artist of the 2000s with US album sales at over 32.25 million during the decade. 
With sales of over 220 million records worldwide, he is among of the best-selling music artists of all time. According to the RIAA, Eminem has sold 227.5 million certified albums and singles in the United States. In his home country, he has earned 50 platinum albums and 10 number one albums.

Eminem's debut album, Infinite, was released by Web Entertainment in 1996. It sold only around a thousand copies and failed to rank on the national charts. After signing a contract with Interscope Records and Aftermath Entertainment, the rapper released The Slim Shady LP in 1999, which debuted at number two on the Billboard 200, and was certified 5x platinum by the RIAA. In the same year, Eminem, along with manager Paul Rosenberg, founded the record label Shady Records.

In 2000, Eminem released his third album, The Marshall Mathers LP, which debuted at number one and sold 1.78 million copies in its first week, breaking records for the fastest-selling hip hop album of all time and the fastest-selling solo album in the United States. With more than ten million copies sold, the album was certified Diamond and was the third best-selling album of the year in the United States.

In 2002, Eminem's fourth album, The Eminem Show, also debuted at number one on the Billboard 200 and reached the top spot on various charts internationally, as it went on to sell 27 million copies worldwide. The Eminem Show was the best-selling album worldwide of 2002, with sales of over ten million copies. The album was certified Diamond in the United States, Canada and Australia.
In the same year, Eminem released the 8 Mile soundtrack, also including songs by various artists. The album peaked at number one in the United States, where it sold more than four million of the nine million copies distributed internationally.

In 2004, Eminem's fifth album Encore became the rapper's third consecutive studio album to reach number one in the United States, Australia, Canada, New Zealand and United Kingdom. Sales, however, were significantly less than the two previous albums, with over five million sold copies in the United States and eleven million worldwide. 
Eminem released a greatest hits album titled Curtain Call: The Hits in 2005, which sold almost three million copies in the US. The following year, Shady Records released Eminem Presents: The Re-Up, a compilation album performed by Eminem along various artists from the record label. The album received a platinum certification from the RIAA in 2007 and sold slightly over a million copies in the United States.

After a hiatus of more than four years, Relapse, Eminem's sixth studio album, was released in 2009 and was the rapper's fourth consecutive studio album to top the charts in the United States, Australia, Canada, New Zealand and United Kingdom, with domestic sales of over two million copies. In the subsequent year, Eminem released his seventh studio album Recovery, which debuted at number one on the Billboard 200 and reached the top spot on various charts internationally. 
According to the International Federation of the Phonographic Industry, it was also the best-selling album of 2010 worldwide.

Eminem was named the best-selling artist in Canada in 2010 and 2013, when he released his eighth studio album The Marshall Mathers LP 2. The album was followed by Revival in 2017. Both The Marshall Mathers LP2 and Revival reached the top spot of the Billboard 200 in their first week, making Eminem the first music act to have eight entries in a row debut at the top of the Billboard chart. On August 31, 2018, Eminem released his unannounced tenth album, Kamikaze, becoming his ninth consecutive album to debut at number 1. He followed this with another surprise album titled Music to Be Murdered By, on January 17, 2020, as well as a deluxe edition released on December 18, 2020, titled Music to Be Murdered By - Side B, which featured sixteen additional tracks.

Studio albums

Compilation albums

Collaborative albums

Soundtrack albums

Reissued albums

Extended plays

Box sets

See also
 Eminem singles discography
 Eminem production discography
 Eminem videography
 Bad Meets Evil discography
 D12 discography

Notes

A  The 50 platinum albums certifications by the Recording Industry Association of America include forty-five platinum certifications credited as a solo artist and five certifications for albums with various artists. The 10 number one albums on the Billboard 200 include nine number one albums credited as a solo artist and one number one album with various artists.
B  The reported chart positions are of the latter release The Slim Shady LP (Special Edition). The original album release peaked up to number 46 on the Belgian Ultratop and 77 on the Swiss Hitparade.
C  The reported peak chart positions are indicative of the UK Compilation Albums Chart, as soundtracks and compilation albums by various artists are not eligible for the UK Albums Chart.

References

Discographies of American artists
Discography
Hip hop discographies